This is a list of members of the first legislature of the Supreme Soviet of the Estonian Soviet Socialist Republic which was the Estonian SSR's legislative chamber between 1940 and 1941, and between 1944 and 1992. In the first phase, the Soviet Union occupied the Republic of Estonia and dissolved the parliament (Riigikogu), then in its sixth legislature, on 5 July 1940. A new Stalinist "people's parliament" was "elected" on 14 and 15 July (with only members of the Soviet-backed Estonian Working People's Union allowed to stand for election), and the newly formed chamber announced the establishment of the "Estonian SSR" on 21 July and the self-proclaimed state was annexed by the Soviet Union on 6 August 1940. The chamber was officially called the Riigivolikogu (State Council) from inception until 25 August 1940 when it was designated the ENSV Ajutine Ülemnõukogu (Provisional Supreme Soviet of the ESSR) and then on 7 April 1941 was formally styled the ENSV Ülemnõukogu (Supreme Soviet of the Estonian SSR). Between July 1941 and 1944, Estonia was occupied by Germany. When the Soviet Union regained power in 1944, it continued the legislative session of the Supreme Soviet and extended it until the session's end on 16 February 1947. Elections for the second Supreme Soviet followed.

List of members 
Source: Jaan Toomla, Valitud ja Valitsenud: Eesti parlamentaarsete ja muude esinduskogude ning valitsuste isikkoosseis aastail 1917–1999 (National Library of Estonia, 1999), pp. 82–84.

References 

Lists of political office-holders in Estonia
Estonian Soviet Socialist Republic